The 1948 Virginia Cavaliers football team represented the University of Virginia during the 1948 college football season. The Cavaliers were led by third-year head coach Art Guepe and played their home games at Scott Stadium in Charlottesville, Virginia. They competed as independents, finishing with a record of 5–3–1.

Schedule

References

Virginia
Virginia Cavaliers football seasons
Virginia Cavaliers football